is a Japanese politician of the Democratic Party of Japan, a member of the House of Councillors in the Diet (national legislature).

Overview 
A native of Ikoma, Nara and graduate of Kyoto University, he was elected to the House of Councillors for the first time in 2007 after running unsuccessfully for the House of Representatives in 2005.

External links 
  in Japanese.

1971 births
Living people
Politicians from Nara Prefecture
Kyoto University alumni
Members of the House of Representatives (Japan)
Members of the House of Councillors (Japan)
Democratic Party of Japan politicians
21st-century Japanese politicians